Madame Papavoine née Pellecier (born c. 1735, fl. 1755-61) was a French composer. She married violinist Louis-August Papavoine some time before 1755. Nothing else is known about Madame Papavoine; even her first name is a mystery. After 1761, her name is no longer mentioned.

Works
The Mercure de France published a "Catalogue des oeuvres de M. et Mme Papavoine" in January 1755. This and later issues listed her works as:
Les arrets d’amour, cantatille as Mlle. Pellecier
La tourterelle, cantatille as Mlle. Pellecier
Les charmes de la voix, cantatille as Mlle. Pellecier
La fête de l’amour, cantatille as Mlle. Pellecier
Issé, cantatilles as Mlle. Pellecier
Le joli rien, cantatille as Mlle. Pellecier
Le triomphe des plaisirs, cantatille, as Mme. Papavoine
Le Cabriolet, cantatille with two violins, as Mme. Papavoine
Nous voici donc au jour l’an, 12-bar unaccompanied air gaiment
Vous fuyez sans vouloir m’entendre, chanson (1756)
Reviens, aimable Thémire, ‘pastoralle’ (1761)
La France sauvée ou Le triomphe de la vertù, cantatille

References

1735 births
Year of death unknown
18th-century classical composers
French classical composers
French women classical composers
18th-century French composers
18th-century women composers